Glenniea penangensis is a species of plant in the family Sapindaceae. It is a tree endemic to Peninsular Malaysia, but it is threatened by habitat loss.

References

penangensis
Endemic flora of Peninsular Malaysia
Trees of Peninsular Malaysia
Vulnerable plants
Taxonomy articles created by Polbot